Verin Charbakh (also, Verin Ch’arbakh and Charbakh) is a part of Shengavit District in Yerevan, Armenia.

References 

Populated places in Yerevan